Michal Hreus (born March 9, 1973) is a Slovak professional ice hockey player who played with HC Slovan Bratislava in the Slovak Extraliga.
As a junior, he played for Sparta Prague. He was also an active player in a few German teams (Mannheim and Krefeld). He returned to Slovakia in 1998/99 and played in the Slovak Extraliga in Skalica. In the following year he won a championship with the Slovan Bratislava club, where he played 1999 - 2002. During this period he also transferred to the Finnish Rauma Lukko. After playing for the Czech team Litvinov he returned to his home town and started a successful career path at Mshk Žilina. Hreus was one of the team's key players to gain the championship debut. His former club Slovan Bratislava expressed an interest in Hreus and Mshk Žilina released him until 30 April (along with defender Dalibor Kusovský). During this time Hreus won his third championship.

Awards
1999/00 HC Slovan Bratislava
2005/06 MsHK Žilina
2006/07 HC Slovan Bratislava
2007/08 HC Slovan Bratislava

Career statistics

References

External links

1973 births
Living people
HC Slovan Bratislava players
Slovak ice hockey centres
Czechoslovak ice hockey centres
Slovak expatriate ice hockey players in Germany
Slovak expatriate ice hockey players in the Czech Republic
Slovak expatriate ice hockey players in Finland